The River Pahunan is a tributary of the Kitchigama River, in the administrative region of Nord-du-Québec, in the Canadian province the Quebec, in Canada. The course of this river flows in the townships of Grasset, the Forest and Paramé.

This hydrographic slope does have a winter roads going northward. The surface of the river is frozen from November to May.

Geography
The main neighboring hydrographic slopes are:
North side: Kitchigama River, Kashapuminatikuch Creek;
East side: Deux Lacs River, Lake Soscumica;
South side: Gouault River, Allard River;
West side: Kitchigama River, Joncas River, Rouget River.

The Pahunan River originates from a small unidentified lake located at:
 Southeast of the course of the Nottaway River;
 South of the mouth of Pahunan River;
 Southeast of the mouth of the Kitchigama River;
 Southeast of the mouth of the Nottaway River;
 Northwest of downtown of Matagami.

From its source in the township of Grasset, the river Pahunan flows on  according to the following segments:
 North, to the southern limit of the township of Paramé;
 northwesterly to the eastern limit of the township of La Forest;
 northerly and forming a large curve westerly in the township of Forest and winding in marsh areas, to the limit of township De Paramé;
 northeasterly, and winding up to the outlet of a lake (coming from the East);
 to the North, to the West, up to the limit of the township;
 to the North, snaking to its mouth.

The Pahunan River flows into a river bend on the South shore of the Kitchigama River. This confluence is located at:
 southeasterly of the mouth of the Kitchigama River;
 Southeast of the mouth of the Nottaway River (confluence with Rupert Bay);
 Northwest of downtown Matagami;
 Southwest of Soscumica Lake.

Toponymy 
The toponym "Pahunan River" was made official on December 5, 1968, at the Commission de toponymie du Québec, i.e. at the creation of this commission.

See also 
James Bay
Rupert Bay
Nottaway River
Kitchigama River
List of rivers of Quebec

References 

Rivers of Nord-du-Québec